Pierre Henri Gauttier Duparc (17721850) was a French Navy officer and admiral. Gauttier Duparc captained Chevrette in 1819 during the travels of Jules Dumont d'Urville, where he contributed to the discovery of the Venus de Milo. His interest for marine chronometers earned him the nickname of "Gauttier l'horloge" ("clockwork Gauttier").

Biography

Notes, citations, and references 

Notes

Citations

References
 

French Navy admirals
1772 births
1850 deaths